Celina Consuela Gabriella Carvajal (born January 30, 1980), known professionally as Lena Hall, is an American actress and singer. She originated the role of Nicola in the Broadway musical Kinky Boots and won the Tony Award for her performance as Yitzhak in the 2014 revival of Hedwig and the Angry Inch, which also earned her a Grammy nomination for the musical's official album. She made history by becoming the first person to play both Hedwig and Yitzhak in the same production during the national tour of the musical in 2016. Her other Broadway credits include Cats, 42nd Street, Dracula, the Musical and Tarzan, the Musical. Hall has also starred in Off-Broadway productions such as Radiant Baby, Bedbugs!!!, Rooms: A Rock Romance, The Toxic Avenger, Prometheus Bound, Chix6, Little Shop of Horrors, and the 2017 original play How to Transcend a Happy Marriage.

Hall has appeared in films such as Sex and the City (2008), The Graduates (2008), Born from the Foot (2009), The Big Gay Musical (2009), and Becks (2017), for which she received widespread critical acclaim. She has also appeared on TV shows like ABC's All My Children, HBO's Girls, Amazon Prime's Good Girls Revolt, and voiced the role of Countess Coloratura on My Little Pony: Friendship Is Magic. In 2020, she joined the cast of TNT's science fiction epic Snowpiercer as Miss Audrey.

Hall was the lead singer of the band The Deafening, they released an album with original songs in 2012 titled Central Booking. In 2015, Hall released her first solo album, Sin & Salvation: Live At the Carlyle.

Biography
Celina Consuela Gabriella Carvajal was born in San Francisco, California, on January 30, 1980, to Carlos and Carolyn (née Houser) Carvajal. Her father is a ballet dancer, choreographer and the co-artistic director for the annual San Francisco Ethnic Dance Festival, her mother was a prima ballerina and is now a yogi master.

She has Filipino, Spanish, and Swedish ancestry through her father. Her paternal grandfather arrived from the Philippines to San Francisco in 1926, and her paternal grandmother is Swedish. Her sister is Calliope "Calli" Carvajal, a hair stylist.

She is a graduate of Ruth Asawa San Francisco School of the Arts, where she first studied dance, and an alumna of the Young People's Teen Musical Theatre Company in San Francisco.

Her first big break was singing for Pope John Paul II at Candlestick Park in San Francisco for over 50,000 people at the age of 7.

Hall changed her professional name from "Celina Carvajal" to Lena Hall in 2013, saying she had created it for her music persona and now wanted to use it for her acting career as well. She explained her name change to Broadway.com: "Multiple people in the industry suggested I have one name for everything. [Lena Hall] is just two shortenings of my first name and my last name. So Lena Hall is Celina Carvajal. It seemed like an easier way of people getting to know me. Lena Hall is a nice symmetrical name, and it reminds people of Lena Horne, who was a singer. And when people hear my name, I want them to think of a singer". She later found out that "Carvajal" is actually a stage name taken seven generations back that became a family name. Hall said that it was one of the reasons why she was able to let go of the Carvajal name because it was a stage name, and it felt like her ancestors would agree with her name change.

In December 2018, she announced her engagement to Jonathan Stein. They married on May 27, 2019.

Career
Hall made her Broadway debut in 1999 in Cats, taking over the role of Demeter after first performing in the national tour in 1998. She next took over the role of Ann "Anytime Annie" Reilly in 42nd Street. She also performed in a national tour of Annie Get Your Gun, understudying the lead role.

In 2003, Hall appeared in Radiant Baby, a musical about artist Keith Haring, in various roles. In 2004 she was in the original ensemble of Dracula, the Musical, and was the understudy for Kelli O'Hara as Lucy Westenra. In 2006 she was in the original ensemble of the musical Tarzan, and was also the understudy for Jennifer Gambatese as Jane Porter.

In 2008, she competed in the reality show Legally Blonde: The Musical – The Search for Elle Woods, in which she was the 3rd contestant eliminated, and starred in the Off-Broadway musicals Green Eyes, and Bedbugs!!!, in which she played the role of Carly at the New York Musical Theatre Festival.

In 2009, she was the understudy for Leslie Kritzer in the role of Monica P. Miller in the musical Rooms: A Rock Romance. Also in 2009, she took over the lead role of Sarah in the musical The Toxic Avenger at the New World Stages.

In 2011, she performed as Daughter of the Ocean in the musical Prometheus Bound, inspired by Aeschylus's Ancient Greek tragedy, at the American Repertory Theater, and also appeared as Blaze in the musical Chix6. In 2013, Hall originated the role of Nicola (played on film by Jemima Rooper) in the musical Kinky Boots, which won the Tony Award for Best Musical.

In 2013, her band The Deafening released an album with original songs titled "Central Booking".

In 2014, Hall was cast as Yitzhak in the Broadway production Hedwig and the Angry Inch, (a role previously played off-Broadway by Miriam Shor) opposite Neil Patrick Harris, for which she won the Tony Award for Best Featured Actress in a Musical. She left the role on April 4, 2015, after playing Yitzhak opposite Harris, Darren Criss, Michael C. Hall, Andrew Rannells and John Cameron Mitchell as Hedwig. In 2016, she was cast in the national tour of Hedwig, which opened on October 2, 2016, reprising her role as Yitzhak, and for one performance a week, playing the title role of Hedwig for a total of eight performances in Los Angeles and San Francisco, making her the first actor to play both roles in the same production. She played the roles in San Francisco and Los Angeles alongside Glee star Darren Criss.

Following her run in Hedwig and the Angry Inch, Hall toured North America alongside Josh Groban on his "Stages" tour.

On September 28, 2015, Hall released her first solo album, Sin & Salvation: Live At the Carlyle, featuring her renditions of songs from artists such as Led Zeppelin, Tori Amos, Hozier, and James Brown. The album was recorded at the Carlyle Hotel during Hall's musical show Sin & Salvation, which ran for two weeks.

Her TV work include 9 episodes of All My Children in the role of Treena in 2009, Juicy Lucy in Good Girls Revolt (2015), the voice of Countess Coloratura/Rara in the 115th episode of My Little Pony: Friendship Is Magic, titled "The Mane Attraction".

In 2016, Hall played a seductive yoga instructor in an episode of the HBO series Girls. She also performs the songs along with Tony Vincent for the fictional band "Dog Gone" in the 2015 PBS series Nature Cat.

She has appeared in five movies: Sex and the City (2008), The Graduates (2008), Born from the Foot (2009), The Big Gay Musical (2009), and Becks (2017), in which she plays the title role and her first leading role in a feature film, and received widespread critical acclaim for her performance. which won the U.S. Fiction Award at the LA Film Festival.<ref>{{Cite web|last=Evans|first=Greg|url=https://deadline.com/2017/06/los-angeles-film-festival-award-winners-becks-the-keeping-hours-liyana-1202118603/|title=L.A. Film Fest Award Winners: 'Becks', 'The Keeping HoursAmong Honorees – Complete List|website=Deadline|date=June 22, 2017}}</ref>

In 2017, Hall starred in the role of Pip on Sarah Ruhl's Off-Broadway play How to Transcend a Happy Marriage starring opposite Marisa Tomei at the Lincoln Center.

Hall released a series of 12 digital EPs titled Obsessed in 2018, one per month. The January release consists of selections from Hedwig and the Angry Inch, while each of the others features her renditions of several songs by a different artist.

In 2021, Hall voice acted in a live-streamed reading of a science fiction screenplay called Aurora by Joe Scott, playing multiple roles. The reading, which served as Scott's YouTube channel's Halloween special and centered around the Aurora, Texas, UFO incident, saw its proceeds donated to Team Seas.

Discography
Studio albums

Live albums

Extended plays

Other album appearances
 Tarzan (Original Broadway Cast Recording) (2004)
 Dracula (Original Broadway Cast Recording) (2006)
 Central Booking (2012) – with The Deafening
 Kinky Boots (Original Broadway Cast Recording) (2013)
 Hedwig and the Angry Inch (Original Broadway Cast Recording) (2014)
 Pinkie Pie's Party Playlist (2016)
 Desmond Child Live (2019) – Desmond Child
 Home Street Home, Volume 1'' (2020)

Filmography

Film

Television

Theater

Awards and nominations

References

External links

 Official website
 
 
 
 

Living people
1980 births
Tony Award winners
Actresses from San Francisco
American stage actresses
American film actresses
American women singers
American television actresses
American musical theatre actresses
American actresses of Filipino descent
American people of Spanish descent
American people of Swedish descent
American musicians of Filipino descent
American women songwriters
Songwriters from California
20th-century American actresses
21st-century American actresses